Rosetown Airport  is a registered aerodrome located  north-east of Rosetown, Saskatchewan, Canada. The airport is owned and operated by Provincial Airways and contains several hangars, a small terminal building and maintenance facilities operated by Provincial Airways.

See also 
 List of airports in Saskatchewan

References 

Registered aerodromes in Saskatchewan
St. Andrews No. 287, Saskatchewan
Rosetown